The Last Bridge is a 1954 Austrian-Yugoslavian war drama film directed by Helmut Käutner and starring Maria Schell, Bernhard Wicki and Barbara Rütting. It tells the story of a German nurse who is captured by Yugoslav partisans, and with her devotion to medical duty finds herself with divided loyalty to both sides of the conflict. The film was entered into the 1954 Cannes Film Festival.

The film's sets were designed by the art directors Otto Pischinger and Wolf Witzemann. Location shooting took place in Mostar and the Neretva valley in Bosnia.

Cast
 Maria Schell as Dr. Helga Reinbeck
 Bernhard Wicki as Boro
 Barbara Rütting as Milica
 Carl Möhner as Martin Berger
 Pavle Mincic as Momcillo
 Horst Hächler as Leutnant Scherer
 Robert Meyn as Stabsartz Dr. Rottsieper
 Zvonko Zungul as Partisan Sava
 Tilla Durieux as Mara
 Fritz Eckhardt as Tilleke
 Janez Vrhovec as Partisan Vlaho
 Walter Regelsberger as Nachrichtensoldat
 Steffie Schwarz as Oberschwester
 Bata Stojanovic as Partisan
 Stevo Petrovic as Partisan Ratko
 Milan Nesic as Partisan
 Franz Eichberger as Gebirgsjäger
 Heinrich Einsiedel as Gebirgsjäger
 Pero Kostic as Partisan

References

Bibliography
 Von Dassanowsky, Robert . Austrian Cinema: A History. McFarland, 2005.

External links

 The Last Bridge at filmportal.de/en

1954 films
1954 drama films
1950s war drama films
Austrian war drama films
Yugoslav war drama films
1950s German-language films
Films directed by Helmut Käutner
War films set in Partisan Yugoslavia
Anti-war films about World War II
Austrian black-and-white films
Films set in Yugoslavia
Austrian World War II films
Yugoslav black-and-white films